"Whispers of Immortality" is a poem by T. S. Eliot. Written sometime between 1915 and 1918, the poem was published originally in the September issue of the Little Review and first collected in June 1919 in a volume entitled Poems published by Leonard and Virginia Woolf's Hogarth Press. It is one of the quatrain poems, a mode that Eliot had adapted from the mid-19th-century French poet Theophile Gautier.  The title is a fainter parody of William Wordsworth's title of the poem, Intimations of Immortality.

Analysis
The poem was developed in two sections; each contains four stanzas and each stanza contains four lines.  The first section where Eliot paid homage to his great Jacobean masters in whom he found the unified sensibility is a kind of "versified critique" of Jacobean writers, Webster and Donne in particular. Both Webster and Donne are praised by the narrator, the former for seeing the “skull beneath the skin”(l.2), the latter for  not seeking any “substitute for sense/ To seize and clutch and penetrate;/Expert beyond experience,..”(l.10-12). The apparent oxymoron of a "sense" that transcends beyond "experience" is followed by references to "the anguish of the marrow"(l.13) and the uncontrollable “fever of the bone” (l.16) that are too corporeal for mundane experience.
The second section begins with a description of a modern Russian woman Grishkin whose “friendly bust/ Gives promise of pneumatic bliss”(l.19-20). In the following two stanzas, Grishkin is compared to the “Brazilian jaguar” which “does not in its arboreal gloom/ distil so rank a feline smell/ As Grishkin in a drawing room.”(l.26-28) In the concluding stanza, the narrator said that even her charm is the subject of philosophy. Nevertheless “our lot crawls between dry ribs/ To keep our metaphysics warm.”(l.31-32).

References

External links

 
 

1910s poems
Poetry by T. S. Eliot
Modernist poems
American poems